The Black Norwegian Elkhound (Norwegian Elghund Sort (NES) in Norwegian) is a small Spitz breed classified by the FCI as a hunting dog. It is currently an uncommon breed in Norway and very rare outside the Nordic countries of Scandinavia. It is a sibling breed to a Grey Norwegian Elkhound, but is smaller, more agile, doesn't bark and was bred  explicitly for on-leash dog hunting.

Historically  this "little brother  of Grey elkhound" has  from local spitz dog population in the border areas between Norway and Sweden, and has existed as its own breed since the middle of the 19th century. The breed name "Elkhound" comes directly from its original Norwegian name "Elghund," meaning ""elk dog" or "moose dog." In Norwegian, "elg" refers to the animal English speakers know as an "elk" (in Eurasia) or "moose" (in the United States), and "hund" means "dog."

In literature the breed is mentioned by the Englishman Llewelyn Lloyd (naturalist). In 1828 he hunted bear game near the border areas between Norway and Sweden. He was particularly pleased with two dogs he borrowed: "Hector was black, had upright ears and a curled tail, and Pajas, for whom 13 bears had been shot, was coal black with a bushy tail".

Norwegian black elkhound has previously been threatened with extinction. The breed has retained its good utility properties and characteristic exterior for over 100 years. There is now increasing demand for black elkhounds and it is difficult to reach a number of offspring per year that saturates this market. The number of litters and the number of puppies have remained stable over the past 20 years.

Description

Appearance

The Black Norwegian Elkhound is a typical Spitz breed with a short compact body, dark eyes, ears standing straight up, and a curly tail carried over the back. It has a rich coat that does not stand out from the body. This is an all-weather hunting dog and the coat is very important. It must be able to keep out the heavy autumn rain in Scandinavia and endure the cold weather, which it does very well.

It has a dense, short, thick, coarse, double coat and is solid black.

Temperament
The Black Norwegian Elkhound is an all purpose family dog. They have great temperament and are kid friendly. They rarely bark and very tolerant towards smaller pets and can also be used as a companion dogs with other dog breeds. They are highly intelligent and love physical contact with humans. This is the dog that will willingly seek to be petted, hugged and will prefer to be near family members at all times. 

The Black Norwegian Elkhound is a very robust and hardy dog: very alert and full of power and pride. It is more strong-minded than the Grey Elkhound and therefore off-leash walking or hunting is not recommended. The most recommended training method is one that focuses on motivating the dog; such as clicker training or reward-based training methods. Using punishment or dominance-based methods could negatively impact training with the Black Norwegian Elkhound. It is easy to train, but it needs continuous exercise and high activity level. Regular walks in the woods and fields right from the puppy stage lay the foundation for an excellent hiking and hunting companion.

Hunting
The Black Elkhound is used primarily in hunting large game such as moose, deer and bear. This dog is bred for on leash dog hunting and has the ability to cooperate well with the handlers.
The black Elkhound primarily picks up the smell in the air, so it jumps to a higher ground to pick up the scent. Which also makes it an excellent search dog.
As opposed to  grey elkhounds, the black breed rarely bark. It behaves calmly and silently in contact with game so that the hunter can approach the game undetected and take a precise shot.

Health

Norwegian Elghund Black has been known as a healthy and vigorous breed, but surveys and investigations in recent years show that there are cases of hereditary glaucoma, ataxia, epilepsy and transitional vertigo in the breed. The Norwegian breeding committee for the breed prioritizes health highly in the breeding work to avoid sick offspring.

Breeding

It is important for the black elkhound breed to focus on preventing inbreeding. Based on Norwegian kennel club's 5% rule, each male dog for the breed should not have more than 40 registered offspring.  It is planned to introduce a new breed requirement that both parent animals are genetically tested for hereditary glaucoma and ataxia. The Norwegian breeding committee currently only approves matings where one of the dogs has been tested genetically free - this to ensure that no offspring develops hereditary glaucoma.There is a requirement for a known Hip displasia status for all the dogs to be used in breeding. Statistics in relation to HD over the last 10 years show that 83.2% of Norwegian Elghund Sort are free from hip displasia type F.

The full up to date breeding criteria for health, hunting characteristics and exterior for both parent animals are:

 Exhibition prize (minimum Very Good) 
 Hunting prize (minimum 3rd prize)
 Known HD status. Total HD index >205. 
 The upper limit for the degree of inbreeding is 4 (5 generations), with options for dispensation up to 5.
 One of the parent animals must be tested and registered in the stud book genetically free of hereditary glaucoma/primary glaucoma.
 One of the parent animals must be tested and registered as genetically free from hereditary ataxia.

Care

Grooming
The fur requires moderate care and it is recommended to brush the coat two or three times a week. Dense and stiff, but smooth. On the head and the front of the legs dense and smooth, furthest on the chest and neck, on the thighs and the back of the front legs, as well as on the underside of the tail. The fur is formed by longer wispy cover hairs, with soft black undercoat.

The Black Elkhound dog fur is considered to be hypoallergenic, and works well for many people who are allergic to dogs. It is still notable that no dog is 100% allergy-friendly, so you have to try it yourself to see if you react to it or not.

The nails are black and thick, so they will require more frequent trimming than other breeds.

See also
 Dogs portal
 List of dog breeds
 Finnish Lapphund
 Karelian Bear Dog
 Norwegian Buhund
 Norwegian Elkhound
 Norwegian Lundehund
 Swedish Elkhound
 Swedish Lapphund
 Swedish Vallhund

Resources
Books
Norwegian Elkhound (Comprehensive Owner's Guide), 2005.
Norwegian Elkhounds by Anna Katherine Nicholas. TFH, 1997.
The Norwegian Elkhound (Pure Bred) by Nina P. Ross, PhD. Doral, 1995.
The Elkhound in the British Isles by Anne Roslin-Williams. Witherby & Co., 1993.
My 60 Years with Norwegian Elghunds by Olav P. Campbell, 1988.
The New Complete Norwegian Elkhound, revised edition, by Olav Wallo. Howell, 1987.
Norwegian Elkhounds by Anna Katherine Nicholas. TFH, 1983.
Great Gray Dogs: The Norwegian Elkhound Factbook, 2nd edition. Great Gray Dogs, 1980.
Your Norwegian Elkhound by Helen E. Franciose and Nancy C. Swanson. Denlinger, 1974.
How to Raise and Train a Norwegian Elkhound by Glenna Clark Crafts. TFH, 1973. Reprint of the 1964 book with a different cover.
Magazine Articles
Dearth, Kim D.R. "The Norwegian Elkhound" Dog World September 1999, Vol. 84 Issue 9, p12-17.
"Dog of the Vikings" Dog Fancy. April 1998.
"Norwegian Elkhound". Dog World. July 1997, Vol. 82 Issue 7. p86.

References

External links
 Norwegian Elkhound Association of America
 Norwegian Elkhound Club of Great Britain

FCI breeds
Spitz breeds
Dog breeds originating in Norway